Henry A. Kautz (born 1956) is a computer scientist, Founding Director of Institute for Data Science and Professor at University of Rochester. He is interested in knowledge representation, artificial intelligence, data science and pervasive computing.

Biography
Kautz was born in 1956 in Youngstown, Ohio.

Kautz entered the Case Institute of Technology in 1974, then a year later, transferred to Cornell University and got his B.A. in Englishand in mathematics in 1978 there. He wrote plays during a one-year fellowship creative writing program at Johns Hopkins University and got an M.A. by the Writing Seminars in 1980. As a foreign student supported by the Connaught Fellowship, he enrolled at University of Toronto in 1980. Kautz completed his master thesis A First-Order Dynamic Logic for Planning under the supervision of C. Raymond Perrault, and then received his M.S. in computer science in 1982. Before receiving his Ph.D. from University of Rochester in 1987 he was a teaching assistant for Patrick Hayes and a teaching assistant and research assistant for his thesis advisor James F. Allen. His PhD thesis was titled A Formal Theory of Plan Recognition (1987).

Kautz was a professor of Computer Science at University of Washington (2000-2006) after worked at AT&T Bell Labs and AT&T Laboratories. He is now Professor at University of Rochester and Founding Director of Institute for Data Science after worked as a director of Intelligent Systems at Kodak Research Laboratories (2006-2007).

Selected works
Kautz works on wide areas ranging from planning, knowledge representation and artificial Intelligence to data mining, human computation and crowdsourcing, ubiquitous computing, wearable computers, assistive technology and health.

Books
 1991. Reasoning About Plans. (with James F. Allen, R. Pelavin, and J. Tenenberg) Morgan Kaufmann, 1991.

Articles
 2013. 10-Year Impact Award ACM International Joint Conference on Pervasive and Ubiquitous Computing
 2013. Notable Paper First AAAI Conference on Human Computation and Crowdsourcing (HCOMP)
 2012. Best Paper Fifth ACM International Conference on Web Search and Data Mining (WSDM)
 2005. Best Paper IEEE International Symposium on Wearable Computers (ISWC)
 2004 & 2006. 1st Place ICAPS Planning Competition (Optimal Track)
 1996 & 2004. Best Paper Conference on Artificial Intelligence (AAAI)
 1993 & 2012. Notable Paper Conference on Artificial Intelligence (AAAI)
 1989. Best Paper International Conference on Knowledge Representation & Reasoning (KRR)
 1988. Best Paper Canadian Society for Computational Studies of Intelligence (CSCSI)

Patent
 1993. Optimization of Information Bases. US patent issued November 1993
 1997. Mechanism for Constraint Satisfaction. US patent issued June 1997
 1997. Message Filtering Techniques. US patent issued April 1997

AI Limericks
Henry Kautz created limericks on AI, which can be seen here (retrieved January 14 2015).

Awards and honors
 1989. IJCAI Computers and Thought Award.
 the premier award for artificial intelligence researchers under the age of 35.
 1991. AAAI Fellow.
 "For contributions to many areas of artificial intelligence, from plan recognition to knowledge representation to software agents."
 2006. AAAS Fellow.
 2010-2012. President of AAAI.
 2013. ACM Fellow.
 "For contributions to artificial intelligence and pervasive computing with applications to assistive technology and health."
 2013. 10-Year Impact Award of ACM International Joint Conference on Pervasive and Ubiquitous Computing.
 2018. ACM-AAAI Allen Newell Award.

References

External links
 Henry A Kautz's Home Page
 Google Scholar of Henry Kautz, h-index is 65	.

Cornell University alumni
1956 births
Living people
University of Rochester faculty
Fellows of the Association for the Advancement of Artificial Intelligence
Fellows of the American Association for the Advancement of Science
Fellows of the Association for Computing Machinery
Artificial intelligence researchers
Scientists at Bell Labs
Johns Hopkins University alumni
University of Toronto alumni
University of Rochester alumni
Presidents of the Association for the Advancement of Artificial Intelligence